YUI Orta is the seventh solo studio album by English singer Ian Hunter. The title is a play on the phrase "Why you, I ought to...".  Hunter reunites again with longtime collaborator Mick Ronson, as The Hunter Ronson Band.

It was intended as a sort of comeback for both men, but the record company did little promotion and eventually they were dropped from the label. There were plans for a follow up, but these were put on hold when Ronson was diagnosed with liver cancer. In "Big Time", Hunter borrows the riff from his own song "Once Bitten Twice Shy". In "Tell It Like It Is" Ronson borrows the riff from "Get It On".

In 2003, the album was reissued with two bonus tracks.

Track listing
All songs written by Ian Hunter except where noted

"American Music" – 4:12
"The Loner" – 4:47
"Women's Intuition" (Hunter, Ronson) – 6:31
"Tell It Like It Is" (Hunter, Ronson) – 4:23
"Livin' in a Heart" – 4:34
"Big Time" – 4:03
"Cool" (Hunter, Ronson) – 4:30
"Beg a Little Love" (Hunter, Robbie McNasty) – 6:26
"Following in your Footsteps" (Hunter, Ronson) – 5:02
"Sons 'n' Lovers" – 4:55
"Pain" (Hunter, Donnie Kehr) – 4:43
"How Much More Can I Take" – 3:48
"Sweet Dreamer" (Don Gibson, Ronson) – 6:28
"4th Hour of My Sleep" (Tucker Zimmerman) – 3:08 *
"Power of Darkness" (Ronson, Benny Marshall) – 3:32 *

 * Bonus tracks on 2003 CD re-release. This was a re-release of the January 1971 single by Ronno; which consisted of Benny Marshall (vocals), Mick Ronson (guitar), Tony Visconti (bass) and Woody Woodmansey (drums). Tucker Zimmerman was an American friend of Visconti.

Personnel
Ian Hunter - lead vocals, backing vocals; piano on "Sweet Dreamer"
Mick Ronson - guitars, backing vocals
Pat Kilbride - bass
Tommy Mandel - keyboards
Mickey Curry - drums
Joe Cerisano - backing vocals
Carmella Long - backing vocals
Donnie Kehr - backing vocals
Robbie Alter - backing vocals
Carola Westerlund - backing vocals
Bernard Edwards - bass on "Women's Intuition"
Benny Marshall - vocals on bonus tracks
Technical
David O'Donnell, Matthew "Boomer" Lamonica, Michael Christopher, Roy Hendrickson - engineer
Bernard Edwards, Larry Alexander - mixing
Mitchell Kanner - art director, designer

References

Ian Hunter (singer) albums
Mick Ronson albums
1989 albums
Albums produced by Bernard Edwards
Albums with cover art by Mick Rock
Mercury Records albums